Montescano is a comune (municipality) in the Province of Pavia in the Italian region Lombardy, located about 50 km south of Milan and about 20 km southeast of Pavia.

Montescano borders the following municipalities: Canneto Pavese, Castana, Montù Beccaria.

References

External links
 Official website

Cities and towns in Lombardy